One Shot, Two Shot is the first Korean extended play by South Korean singer-songwriter BoA. Released digitally on February 20, 2018 by her native label SM Entertainment with Iriver as the distributor, the extended play is the singer's first major Korean release in nearly three years since her eighth Korean studio album Kiss My Lips (2015), and subsequently her second major release in 2018 just one week after releasing Watashi Kono Mama de li no Kana, her first Japanese album in over four years also.

Composition 
Featuring seven new tracks that center around the singer's "alternate perspectives and approaches to matured romance", the extended play incorporates "heavy-bass" deep house and EDM genres, while seeing BoA exploring herself in new genres, such as trap and hip-hop. Wanting to "breathe some freshness" into her discography, the singer went on to collaborate with rapper Junoflo and producer Chancellor, whom also contributed lyrically and musically to the extended play along with several other producers, such as Yoo Young-jin, Devine Channel, Josh Cumbee, Tayla Parx, Micah Powell, Mike Daley, Mitchell Owens, Harvey Mason Jr., The Stereotypes, and more.

Reception 
Upon its release, One Shot, Two Shot received positive reviews from critics, whom regarded the extended play as one of her best releases, further praising its mature sound comparing to her previous release. It was, however, a moderate commercial success in her native country, becoming her fifth top-ten entry on the Gaon Album Chart, as well as her second top-ten entry on the Billboard World Albums chart. To further promote the extended play, three singles were released in between 2017 and 2018; namely "Camo", "Nega Dola", and the titular "One Shot, Two Shot".

Track listing

Charts

Sales

Release history

References 

SM Entertainment EPs
Korean-language EPs
2018 EPs
BoA albums
IRiver EPs